The Geto Boys is a remix album by the Geto Boys released in 1990. The album contains one track from the group's debut album Making Trouble (1988), 10 from its previous album Grip It! On That Other Level (1989), and two new songs. All tracks on the album were re-recorded, remixed and revamped by acclaimed producer Rick Rubin with his protégé Brendan O'Brien. The cover of the album resembles The Beatles' album Let It Be, and the songs attracted much controversy upon the album's release.

Controversy and release
The original Def American pressing is the only WEA-distributed album with the following warning in addition to the standard explicit-lyrics sticker:

Due to the controversial nature of the lyrics, especially in the songs "Mind of a Lunatic" and "Assassins", the album's originally intended distributor, Geffen Records, and CD manufacturer Sony DADC, which manufactured Geffen's releases, refused to have any part in the release. After Geffen terminated its manufacturing and distributing deal with Def American, Rick Rubin arranged alternative distribution with Warner Bros. Records, which agreed to distribute the album as intended and all subsequent Def American releases with product manufacturing by WEA Manufacturing. Marketing for the album was handled by Warner Bros. sister label Giant Records.

Subsequent pressings on Rap-a-Lot and various distributors do not contain the secondary warning. "Do It Like a G.O." was released as a single with a music video but did not chart.

Reception

In a 3.5-mic out of 5 review, The Source wrote positively of Rick Rubin's contribution to the album, writing, "The group's fuck-everybody attitude and simple straight-forward music is a perfect match for Rubin...." Andy Kellman of AllMusic also praised Rick Rubin's contribution, writing, "The album is expertly sequenced, and some songs seem to have twice the impact of their original incarnations."

Robert Christgau, on the other hand, criticized the album, comparing it negatively to slasher films. Christgau ended the review, writing, "I'm impressed by [its] pungent beats and vernacular. I'm glad they put Reagan in bed with Noriega. I'm sorta touched when one of them thinks to thank the first girl to lick his asshole. I admire their enunciation on 'Fuck ’Em.' But fuck ’em." In another mixed review, Entertainment Weekly's Greg Sandow ridiculed the album's glorification of violence, writing, "The catalog starts to seem silly. Stealing from the poor? On their next album, the Geto Boys might just as well do a song about tearing wings off flies."

Track listing

Personnel
The following people contributed to The Geto Boys:

Geto Boys

 DJ Ready Red
Akshen
Bushwick Bill
Willie D

Production

 Prince Johnny C – producer (Geto Boys member)
 John Bido – producer
 Clifford Blodget – engineer, executive producer
 DJ Ready Red – producer
 Doug King – producer
 Sylvia Massy – engineer
 Brendan O'Brien – remixing
 Ready Red – producer
 Billy Roberts – photography
Rick Rubin – production supervisor
 James H. Smith – executive producer
 Howie Weinberg – mastering

Charts

References

Further reading

 

1990 albums
Geto Boys albums
Rap-A-Lot Records albums
American Recordings (record label) albums
Horrorcore albums
Albums produced by Rick Rubin
Obscenity controversies in music